Mario Rodriguez (born 1959), is an American wheelchair fencer.

Biography
Rodriguez was born in Houston, Texas. In 1985 a low speed motorcycle accident revealed a malignant tumor in his right hip resulting in resection, removal, and reconstruction that ultimately failed ending in eventual amputation of his right hip & leg or hip-disarticulation/semi-hemipelvectomy in April, 1992. In 2002 and 2003 respectively he won 3 bronze medals in three different world cups in men's category A foil in Austin, Texas, United States; Madrid, Spain; and Warsaw, Poland. In 2010 he was a gold medalist at the North American Cup for sabre and in 2011 won another gold for foil at the Parapan American Games. Before he became a paralympian he served as a representative of the United States Air Force as a Russian translator in Crete for four years.

References

1959 births
Living people
Sportspeople from Houston
American male épée fencers
American amputees
Paralympic wheelchair fencers of the United States
Wheelchair fencers at the 1996 Summer Paralympics
Wheelchair fencers at the 2000 Summer Paralympics
Wheelchair fencers at the 2004 Summer Paralympics
Wheelchair fencers at the 2012 Summer Paralympics
American male foil fencers
American male sabre fencers